Pochuta is a municipality in the Chimaltenango department of Guatemala.

History and general information 

The town was known as "San Miguel Pochuta" during the Spanish colony and was elevated to a municipality in 1921. It has an area of 170 km2 and its municipal capital sits at 916 m above sea level. The main religious annual celebrations are in September, after Michael Archangel.

Name origin 

"Pochuta" comes from the nahuatl Pochotl or Pochotla, which means "Place of ceibas".

Geographic location

Pochuta is surrounded by Chimaltenango Department municipalities except on the west, where it borders San Lucas Tolimán, a Sololá Department municipality:

See also
 
 
 List of places in Guatemala

References

Municipalities of the Chimaltenango Department